Bimetallic or bi-metallic may refer to:

Bimetallism, a monetary standard in economics
Bimetallic strip, a temperature sensitive mechanical device
Alloy (binary alloy), in metallurgy, a mixture of two metals
Bi-metallic coin
Bi-Metallic Investment Co. v. State Board of Equalization